The 1973 Des Moines International was a men's tennis tournament played on indoor carpet courts at the Veterans Memorial Auditorium in Des Moines, Iowa in the United States that was part of the 1973 USLTA Indoor Circuit. It was the third and last edition of the event and was held from January 29 through February 2, 1973. Third-seeded Clark Graebner won the singles title and earned $3,000 first-prize money.

Finals

Singles
 Clark Graebner defeated  Nicholas Kalogeropoulos 7–5, 4–6, 6–4
 It was Graebner's only singles title of the year and  the fourth of his career in the Open Era.

Doubles
 Jiří Hřebec /  Jan Kukal defeated  Juan Gisbert, Sr. /  Ion Ţiriac 4–6, 7–6, 6–1

References

Des Moines International
Des Moines International
Des Moines International
Des Moines International